Elachista falirakiensis is a moth of the family Elachistidae. It is found in Greece (the Dodecanese Islands).

References

falirakiensis
Moths described in 2000
Moths of Europe